Klátova Nová Ves is a village and municipality in Partizánske District in the Trenčín Region of western Slovakia. It was named until 1927 Klatnovejsa.

History
In historical records the village was first mentioned in 1310.
It belonged to the Kingdom of Hungary until 1918.

Geography
The municipality lies at an altitude of 199 metres and covers an area of 35.038 km². It has a population of about 1570 people.

Genealogical resources

The records for genealogical research are available at the state archive "Statny Archiv in Nitra, Slovakia"

 Roman Catholic church records (births/marriages/deaths): 1726-1901 (parish A)
 Lutheran church records (births/marriages/deaths): 1708-1895 (parish B)

See also
 List of municipalities and towns in Slovakia

External links

 Official page
https://web.archive.org/web/20071006173841/http://www.statistics.sk/mosmis/eng/run.html
Surnames of living people in Klatova Nova Ves

References

Villages and municipalities in Partizánske District